Aleksić is a Serbian  or Montenegrin surname, a patronymic derived from Aleksa. Notable people with the surname include:

Mihajlo Aleksic (born 2008), known for Video Editor, Musician, and graphic designer. Also known as best young Serbian CS:GO player.
Danijel Aleksić (born 1991), Serbian football player
Milan Aleksić (born 1986), Serbian water polo player
Milija Aleksic (1951–2012), former English football player
Mija Aleksić (1923–1995), Serbian actor
Miša Aleksić (born 1953), Serbian musician
Petar Aleksic (born 1968), Bosnian basketball coach
Seka Aleksić (born 1981), Serbian singer
Srđan Aleksić (1966–1993), Bosnian war-time hero

Serbian surnames
Patronymic surnames
Surnames from given names